Meza banda, the dark three-spot missile, is a butterfly in the family Hesperiidae. It is found in Nigeria (the Cross River loop), Cameroon, the Central African Republic and the central part of the Democratic Republic of the Congo. The habitat consists of forests and mature secondary growth.

Adults are attracted to flowers.

References

Butterflies described in 1937
Erionotini